Keles is a town and district of Bursa Province in the Marmara region of Turkey.

References

External links
 Gököz Village

Populated places in Bursa Province
Districts of Bursa Province